Actors (original title: Les Acteurs) is a 2000 French comedy film directed by Bertrand Blier.

Plot
A collection of portraits of actors (exclusively men, with the exception of Josiane Balasko interpreting André Dussollier) who meet and tell their stories in a more or less structured manner. They describe their craft with a certain ironic distance.

Cast

 Pierre Arditi as himself
 Claude Rich as himself
 Josiane Balasko as André Dussollier 2
 Jean-Paul Belmondo as himself
 François Berléand as François Nègre
 Dominique Blanc as Geneviève
 Claude Brasseur as himself
 Jean-Claude Brialy as himself
 Alain Delon as himself
 Gérard Depardieu as himself
 Albert Dupontel as the cop
 Serge Riaboukine as the motorcycle cop
 André Dussollier as himself
 Jacques François as himself
 Sami Frey as himself
 Michel Galabru as the killed actor
 Ticky Holgado as the tramp
 Michael Lonsdale as the man on the street
 Jean-Pierre Marielle as himself
 Patachou as the blind lady
 Michel Piccoli as himself
 Maria Schneider as herself
 Michel Serrault as himself
 Jean Topart as the filmmaker
 Jacques Villeret as himself
 Jean Yanne as Dr. Belgoder
 Bertrand Blier as himself
 Franck de la Personne as a client
 François Morel as the autograph's man
 Laurent Gamelon as the taxi driver
 Michel Vuillermoz as the nurse
 Marie-Christine Adam
 Éric Prat

Release
The film was screened at the Mar del Plata International Film Festival in Argentina in 2001.

References

External links

Actors at Le Film Guide

2000 films
2000 comedy films
Films directed by Bertrand Blier
French comedy films
2000s French-language films
Films produced by Alain Sarde
2000s French films